The 2022–23 season is Galatasaray's 111th season in the existence of the club. The team plays in the Basketball Super League and in the Basketball Champions League.

Overview

July
The regular season fixture of Galatasaray Nef, which will continue its European adventure in the FIBA Basketball Champions League this season, was announced on 13 July 2022.

August
The fixture of the 2022–23 season of the Basketbol Süper Ligi was determined with the drawing of lots held on 30 August 2022 at Sinan Erdem Dome.

September
In the statement made on 30 September 2022, as a result of the controls made by Jehyve Floyd, a fracture was detected in the metatarsal bone. The treatment process is expected to last between 4 and 6 weeks.

November
On 26 November 2022, it was announced that the contract of Galatasaray Nef Head Coach Andreas Pistiolis was extended until the end of the 2024–25 basketball season.

January
It was announced that Kerem Tunçeri, who assumed the post of General Director on 18 January 2023, resigned.

Sponsorship and kit manufacturers

Supplier: Umbro
Name sponsor: Nef
Main sponsor: Nef

Back sponsor: —
Short sponsor: Nef
Socks sponsor: —

Team

Squad information

Depth chart

Transactions

In

 

|}

Out

 
 
 

|}

Out on loan

|}

Technical Staff

Administrative Staff

Pre-season and friendlies

Friendly match

Competitions

Overview

Basketball Super League

League table

Results summary

Results by round

Matches

''Note: All times are TRT (UTC+3) as listed by the Turkish Basketball Federation.

Basketball Champions League

Regular season

Regular Season Matches

Round of 16

Round of 16 Matches

Turkish Basketball Cup

Quarterfinals

References

External links
Galatasaray NEF - GALATASARAY.ORG 
Galatasaray Basketbol (@GSBasketbol) _ Twitter 

Galatasaray S.K. (men's basketball) seasons
Galatasaray
2022–23 Basketball Champions League
Galatasaray Sports Club 2022–23 season